Harold King may refer to:
 Harold King (politician) (1906–1983), Australian politician
 Harold King (rugby league), Australian rugby league player
 Harold King (author) (1945–2010), American author
 Harold King (chemist), British organic chemist
 Hal King (born 1944), retired Major League Baseball player
 Harold Wayne King (1901–1985), American musician, songwriter, singer and orchestra leader

See also
Harry King (disambiguation)

King Harold (disambiguation)